Roy Francis is a Jamaican record producer.

He started his Phase One label in 1977, recording The Chantells, Lopez Walker, Errol Davis, Steve Boswell, Jah Berry, The Terrors, The Heptones, and Dean Fraser.

As a songwriter he co-composed "Thief" as recorded by Yellowman in 1991, and "Poor and Simple" by Luciano in 1993.[]

Partial discography
Compilation album
We Are Getting Bad : The Sound Of Phase One - Motion Records

See also
List of Jamaican record producers

External links
Discography of 1970's recordings & dub sources at X-Ray Music

Year of birth missing (living people)
Living people
Jamaican record producers
Jamaican reggae musicians